Charles Whittle may refer to:
 Charles Whittle (cricketer)
 Charles Whittle (entertainer)